Mission Kathmandu: The Adventures of Nelly and Simon, also known as The Yeti Adventures and A Yeti Adventure, is a 2017 French-language Canadian 3D computer-animated adventure comedy film directed by Nancy Florence Savard and Pierre Greco, from a screenplay by Greco and . It was the third film produced by Productions 10e Ave, a film studio which Savard founded. The film received a limited theatrical release in Quebec on 23 February 2018.

Synopsis 
Set in 1950s Quebec, the plot concerns Nelly Maloye, a rookie detective, and Simon Picard, a scientific researcher's assistant. After accidentally meeting one day, they both realise they believe in the yeti and decide to embark on an adventure aimed at proving its existence.

Voice cast

English dub 
Rachelle Lefevre as Nelly Maloye
Noel Fisher as Simon Picard
Colm Feore as Taylor
Julian Stamboulieh as Tensing Gombu
Jesse Camacho as Annulu Gombu
Bronwen Mantel as Shirisha Gombu and Mrs. Martineau)
Arthur Holden as Edward Martineau
Terrence Scammell as the university guard and captain
Grant Baciocco as Jazzmi
Alexandrine Warren voices Jazzmi in the Canadian English dub
François Trudel as yetis
Patrick Ouellet as yetis

Production 
Mission Kathmandu: The Adventures of Nelly and Simon was the third film produced by Productions 10e Ave, a film studio which director Nancy Florence Savard founded. Production for the film began in May 2014, and involved more than 200 people. It was produced almost entirely in Quebec City. At a budget of $8.5 million, the film received financial support from Telefilm Canada and Société de développement des entreprises culturelles.

Release 
Mission Kathmandu: The Adventures of Nelly and Simon had its world premiere on 21 October 2017 at the Cinekid Festival in the Netherlands. It received a limited release to 50 screens in Quebec, Canada, on 23 February 2018. It was distributed by Seville Films.

Critical reception 
The film received generally mixed reviews.

André Duchesne, writing for La Presse, stated that "the first 15 minutes of Nelly and Simon – Mission Yéti are the best. […] But when the team lands in Nepal to go to the Himalayas, the story deflates," adding "Thereafter, we chew the same jokes. Like those surrounding the lack of orientation of the two heroes or the endless daredevil slips." Charles-Henri Ramond of Films du Québec gave the film 2.5 stars out of 5, stating, while recognising that the film had a low budget, "Cut for a very young audience, the story turns out to be very predictable and very light, which only very minimally exploits the folklore of the tales and legends surrounding this half-man half-ape beast [yeti]." Ramond praised the performance of Sylvie Moreau.

References

External links 
 (in French)
In English

2017 films
2017 3D films
2017 computer-animated films
2010s Canadian animated films
2010s adventure comedy films
Animated films about birds
Canadian children's animated films
Films set in 1956
Films set in the Himalayas
Films about Mount Everest
Films set in Nepal
French-language Canadian films
Films about Yeti
2010s Canadian films